Carntyne railway station serves the Carntyne area of Glasgow, Scotland. The station is 2¾ miles (4 km) east of Glasgow Queen Street railway station on the North Clyde Line. The station is managed by ScotRail.
The ticket office, constructed when the line was electrified by British Railways in 1960, was cleared away in the early 1990s leaving Carntyne station unstaffed and with only basic 'bus stop'-style shelters on the platforms for passengers to use.

Daily services 
As of 10 December 2017:
 Half-hourly service to Edinburgh Waverley (calling Shettleston, Coatbridge Sunnyside, Airdrie then all stations to Edinburgh Waverley)
Half-hourly service to Airdrie calling all stations. 
Half-hourly service to Balloch calling all stations via Glasgow Queen Street Low Level and via Singer.
Half-hourly service to Milngavie via Glasgow Queen Street Low Level

Evening services are as follows: 
Half-hourly service to Edinburgh Waverley calling all stations.
Half-hourly service to Helensburgh Central calling all stations via Glasgow Queen Street Low Level and via Singer.

Sunday services are as follows: 
Half-hourly service to Edinburgh Waverley calling all stations.
Half-hourly service to Helensburgh Central calling all stations via Glasgow Queen Street Low Level and via Singer.

References

External links 

Railway stations in Glasgow
Former North British Railway stations
Railway stations in Great Britain opened in 1871
Railway stations in Great Britain closed in 1917
Railway stations in Great Britain opened in 1919
SPT railway stations
Railway stations served by ScotRail
1871 establishments in Scotland